Events in the year 1966 in Norway.

Incumbents
 Monarch – Olav V
 Prime Minister – Per Borten (Centre Party)

Events

 7 August – The Storskog border control between Norway and the Soviet Union is opened. It remains the only legal border crossing from Norway to Russia till this day.
 The first Bislett Games were held at Bislett Stadium in Oslo.

Popular culture

Sports

Music 

Arne Bendiksen – "Intet er nytt under solen", performed by Åse Kleveland in the Eurovision Song Contest 1966
Harald Sæverud – Symphony no 9

Film

Literature
Karin Bang, poet and novelist, is awarded the Riksmål Society Literature Prize.
Ebba Haslund, novelist, is awarded the Norwegian Booksellers' Prize for the novel Det trange hjerte.

Notable births
 

31 January – Anne Berge, alpine skier.
9 February – Harald Eia, comedian
23 February – Tone Wilhelmsen Trøen, politician.
19 March – Jan-Paul Brekke, sociologist and comedian
7 April –
 Morgan Andersen, ice hockey player.
 Kathrine Kleveland, politician.
13 April – Hanne Skartveit, journalist and political editor.
30 April – Ivo de Figueiredo, historian, biographer and literary critic.
2 May – Øyvind Rimbereid, author and poet
22 May – Ivar Michal Ulekleiv, biathlete.
11 July – Arnfinn Bårdsen, judge
14 July – Brynjar Lia, historian and research professor
21 July – Lars Fiske, comic writer and creator of picture books.
23 July – Birthe Hegstad, footballer.
28 September –
 Alvhild Hedstein, politician
 André Løvestam, businessperson
25 October – Helge Orten, politician.
27 October –
 Helene Falch Fladmark, politician
 Hege Nerland, politician (d.2007)
19 December – Sylvia Brustad, politician and Minister

Full date unknown
Ole Petter Wie, businessperson

Notable deaths

15 January – Birger Braadland, politician (b.1879)
3 February – Ivar Navelsaker, military officer (b. 1893).
24 March – Morten Ansgar Kveim, pathologist (b.1892)
26 March – Wilhelm Engel Bredal, politician (b.1907)
2 April – Sverre Hope, politician (b.1902)
6 April – Hans Engen, journalist, diplomat and politician (b.1912)
10 April – Jens Marcus Mottré, politician (b.1886)
11 May – Rolf Hofmo, politician and sports official (b. 1898).
26 May – Helga Eng, psychologist and educationalist (born 1875).
28 May – Harry Haraldsen, speed skater (b.1911)
6 June – Hans Ingvald Hansen Ratvik, politician (b.1883)
18 June – Einar Skjæraasen, author (b.1900)
5 July 
Ole Jørgensen, politician (b.1897)
Anders Moen, gymnast and Olympic silver medallist (b.1887)
14 July – Nils Andresson Lavik, politician (b.1884)
17 July – Nils Dahl, middle-distance runner (b.1882)
5 August – Halvard Olsen, politician and trade unionist (b. 1886).
16 August – Carl Klæth, gymnast and Olympic silver medallist (b.1887)
20 August – Marie Ingeborg Skau, politician (b.1890)
26 August – Nils Asheim, politician (b.1895)
13 September – Alfred Engelsen, gymnast and Olympic gold medallist (b.1893)
10 October – Kristian Albert Christiansen, politician (born 1888).
13 October – Asbjørn Øverås, educator (b.1896)
15 October – Jon Andrå, politician (b.1888)
25 November – Hans Reidar Holtermann, commander of Hegra Fortress (b.1895)
13 December – Ingvald Johannes Jaklin, politician (b.1896)
20 December – Aslaug Låstad Lygre, poet (b.1910).
26 December – Christopher Dahl, sailor and Olympic gold medallist (b.1898)

See also

References

External links